Bulgarios may refer to:

 brother of Kozar or Kazarig  in Khazar mythology
 Kutrigur chieftain Zabergan
 in Esperanto, word for Bulgarians